Paul Hansen (born April 25, 1964) is a Swedish journalistic photographer working for the newspaper Dagens Nyheter.

In 2013 he won the World Press Photo for a photograph of the funeral procession carrying the bodies of two Palestinian children and their father of the Hijazi family killed during an Israeli air attack on their home. The picture, named "Gaza Burial" was shot on November 20, 2012 in Gaza City.

Awards 
World Press Photo 2013
World Press Photo 2nd Prize General news 2016
"Picture of the Year" in Sweden 2 times
"Photographer of the Year" in Sweden 8 times
"Photographer of the Year," Pictures of the Year International (POYi), 2010 and 2012
"Photographer of the Year," POYi, 2nd prize, 2015

References

External links

Swedish photographers
1964 births
Living people